China Aerodynamics Research and Development Center (CARDC) was founded in 1968. It is the largest research and testing institute of aerodynamics in China, involved in the development of hypersonic missile technology. The center is located in Mianyang City, Sichuan Province. Currently there are more than 1,600 scientists and technicians working there.

The center has been on the United States Department of Commerce's Entity List since 1999.

References

External links
Official website (English language version)

Research institutes in China
Research institutes established in 1968